Lord, I Was Afraid is a 1947 novel by the British writer Nigel Balchin. It sold 11,000 copies in hardback.

References

Bibliography
 Clive James. At the Pillars of Hercules. Pan Macmillan, 2013.

1947 British novels
Novels by Nigel Balchin
William Collins, Sons books